Mar Yohannan Elias Mellus (or Milos, Milus) (1831–1908) was a bishop of the Chaldean Catholic Church.

Elias Mellus was born on September 19, 1831, in Mardin. He entered in the monastery of Rabban Hormizd in Alqosh. On September 21, 1856, he was ordained priest  and on June 5, 1864, he was ordained bishop Aqra by Patriarch Joseph VI Audo.

He worked from 1874 to 1882 in the Indian city of Thrissur. On behalf of the Chaldean Catholic Patriarch Joseph VI Audo, he looked in vain for the reunification of the Catholic faction of Thomas Christians called Syro-Malabar with their sister church, namely the "Patriarchate of Babylon" as the Catholic successor to the ancient catholicate of Seleucia-Ctesiphon.

The experiment resulted in a schism: some of the followers of Mellus left the Chaldean Catholic Church and joined the Chaldean Syrian Church in 1894/1909. This group gained more than regional significance. In 1968 their metropolitan, Mar Thomas Darmo, opposed Assyrian Patriarch Mar Shimun XXI Eshai and formed Ancient Church of the East.

In 1882 Mar Elias Mellus was suspended by his office of bishop and returned to Mosul. After some hesitation he fully reentered in the Chaldean Catholic Church in 1890 and was appointed bishop of Mardin, where he died on February 16, 1908. He wrote a "History of Oriental Chaldean Church" (from the early to mid-6th century).

Notes

Literature 
 Eugène Tisserant: Eastern Christianity in India. Longmans, Green and Co., London 1957, 112-119.
 Georg Graf: History of Christian Arabic literature. 4th Bd Apost Bibl. Vaticana, Città del Vaticano 1951, 112f.
 Joseph Habbi: Les Chaldéens et les Malabar au 19e siècle.In: Oriens Christianus 64 (1980) 82-107.
 

Chaldean bishops
Iraqi Eastern Catholics
People from Mardin
1831 births
1908 deaths